Robert Litt may refer to:

 Robert J. Litt, American sound engineer
 Robert S. Litt, General Counsel of the Office of the Director of National Intelligence